New Geocentric World of Acid Mothers Temple is an album by Acid Mothers Temple & The Melting Paraiso U.F.O., released in 2001 by Squealer Music.

Track listing

Personnel 
Personnel as listed on Acid Mothers website.

 Cotton Casino - vocal, synthesizer, beer & cigarettes
 Tsuyama Atsushi - monster bass, acoustic guitar, vocal, cosmic joker
 Koizumi Hajime - drums, percussion, soprano saxophone, sleeping monk
 Higashi Hiroshi - synthesizer, acoustic guitar, soprano recorder, chorus, dancin' king
 Ichiraku Yoshimitsu - drums, kendo
 Audrey Ginestet - bass, piano, voice, cosmos
 Kawabata Makoto - electric guitars, violin, bowed peacock harp, organ, bouzouki, zurna, alto saxophone, cornemuse, synthesizer, vocal, speed guru

Additional personnel
 Mano Kazuhiko - tenor saxophone
 Ishida Yoko - peacock harp, chorus, cheese cake
 Haco - vocals
 Father Moo - guru and zero
 Magic Aum Gigi - Jew harp, erotic underground

Technical personnel 

 Kawabata Makoto - Engineering and Production
 Ishida Yoko - Photography

References 

Acid Mothers Temple albums
2001 albums